Houshang Seddigh (8 February 1948 – 8 July 2020) was an Iranian fighter pilot. He served as the commander of the Air Force from 1983 to 1986.

Seddigh ranked colonel when he was appointed to the position on 28 November 1983. According to Pierre Razoux, he was more dynamic than his predecessor Mohammad-Hossein Moeinpour and enjoyed the confidence of the Iranian establishment. Seddigh was replaced by Mansour Sattari in 1986.

He died of COVID-19 in Tehran, Seddigh was 72.

See also
 List of Iranian commanders in the Iran–Iraq War

References

Commanders of Islamic Republic of Iran Air Force
Islamic Republic of Iran Army brigadier generals
Islamic Republic of Iran Army personnel of the Iran–Iraq War
Deaths from the COVID-19 pandemic in Iran
2020 deaths
1948 births